The 2010 Portland State Vikings football team represented Portland State University in the 2010 NCAA Division I FCS football season a member of the Big Sky Conference (Big Sky). The Vikings were led by first year head coach Nigel Burton and played their home games at Hillsboro Stadium as PGE Park was under renovation. They finished the season with a record of two wins and nine losses (2–9, 1–7 Big Sky)

Schedule

Source: College Football Data Warehouse: 2010 Season

References

Portland State
Portland State Vikings football seasons
Portland State Vikings football
Portland State Vikings football
Sports in Hillsboro, Oregon